Clavier-Übung, in more modern spelling Klavierübung, is German for "keyboard exercise". In the late 17th and early 18th centuries this was a common title for keyboard music collections: first adopted by Johann Kuhnau in 1689, the term later became mostly associated with Johann Sebastian Bach's four Clavier-Übung publications.

The following composers published works under the title Clavier-Übung:
 Johann Sebastian Bach:
 Clavier-Übung I: six partitas, published separately 1726–1730, then grouped in one volume in 1731
 Clavier-Übung II: Italian Concerto and French Overture (1735)
 Clavier-Übung III: also known as the German Organ Mass (1739)
 Clavier-Übung IV: Aria with Diverse Variations, known as the Goldberg Variations (1741)
 Ferruccio Busoni
 Klavierübung (1918–1925)
 Christoph Graupner:
 Leichte Clavier-Übungen (c.1730)
 Johann Ludwig Krebs
 Clavier Ubung Bestehend in verschiedenen vorspielen und veränderungen einiger Kirchen Gesaenge Nürnberg, J.U. Haffner, c. 1744)
 Clavier-Ubung bestehet in einer [...] Suite [...] Zweyter Theil (Nürnberg, J.U. Haffner, c. 1744)
 Clavier-Ubung bestehend in sechs Sonatinen … IIIter Theil (Nürnberg, J.U. Haffner, c. 1744)
 Johann Philipp Kirnberger
 Clavierübungen mit der bachischen Applicatur, four volumes, 1761–1766
 Johann Krieger
 Anmuthige Clavier-Übung (1698)
 Johann Kuhnau:
 Neuer Clavier-Übung, erster Theil (1689)
 Neuer Clavier-Übung, anderer Theil (1692)
 Vincent Lübeck
 Clavier Übung (1728)
 Georg Andreas Sorge
 Clavier Übung in three parts, 18 sonatas for harpsichord (1738–c.1745)
 Clavier Übung in two parts, 24 preludes for organ or clavichord (1739–42)

References

Sources

External links

Baroque music